The men's 110 metres hurdles event was part of the track and field athletics programme at the 1924 Summer Olympics. The competition was held on Tuesday, July 8, 1924, and on Wednesday, July 9, 1924. Thirty-one hurdlers from 17 nations competed. The maximum number of athletes per nation was 4. The event was won by Daniel Kinsey of the United States, the nation's sixth victory in the seven times the event had been held. South Africa and Sweden each won their first 110 metres hurdles medals with Sydney Atkinson's silver and Sten Pettersson's bronze, respectively.

Background

This was the seventh appearance of the event, which is one of 12 athletics events to have been held at every Summer Olympics. Carl-Axel Christiernsson of Sweden, who had finished sixth in 1920, was the only finalist to return in 1924.

Argentina, Brazil, and Mexico each made their first appearance in the event. The United States made its seventh appearance, the only nation to have competed in the 110 metres hurdles in each Games to that point.

Competition format

The competition used the three-round basic format introduced in 1908. The first round consisted of eight heats, with anywhere between 1 and 6 hurdlers each. The top two hurdlers in each heat advanced to the semifinals (with the exception of heat 7, which had only one hurdler). The 15 semifinalists were divided into three semifinals of 5 hurdlers each; the top two hurdlers in each advanced to the 6-man final.

Records

These were the standing world and Olympic records (in seconds) prior to the 1924 Summer Olympics.

No new world or Olympic records were set during the competition.

Schedule

Results

Round 1

All heats were held on Tuesday, July 8, 1924.

The best two finishers of every heat qualified for the semi-finals. Heat seven saw a walkover as only one competitor qualified for the next round.

Heat 1

Heat 2

Newberry was disqualified for three false starts.

Heat 3

Heat 4

Heat 5

Heat 6

Heat 7

Johnson had a walkover.

Heat 8

Semifinals

All semi-finals were held on Tuesday, July 8, 1924.

The best two finishers of every heat qualified for the final.

Semifinal 1

Semifinal 2

Semifinal 3

Final

The final was held on Wednesday, July 9, 1924. George Guthrie finished third, but was disqualified for knocking over three hurdles, which was not in accordance with the rules in force at that time.

References

External links
Olympic Report
 

Men's hurdles 110 metre
Sprint hurdles at the Olympics